Petr Nikolayevich Sedov (born 24 August 1990 in Sarov, Russian SFSR) is a Russian cross-country skier who participated in his first World Cup in March 2009 in Lahti. Only 18 years old he came in as number ten in 15 kilometre freestyle, in front of prominent names like Dario Cologna, and Tobias Angerer. Previously he has three victories in the FIS Junior Ski World Championships (2008 and 2009).

Sedov finished eighth in the 4 × 10 km relay at the 2010 Winter Olympics in Vancouver.

Cross-country skiing results
All results are sourced from the International Ski Federation (FIS).

Olympic Games

World Championships

World Cup

Season standings

Individual podiums
2 victories – (1 , 1 ) 
2 podiums – (1 , 1 )

Team podiums

 1 victory – (1 )
 3 podiums – (3 )

References

External links
 

1990 births
Living people
People from Sarov
Cross-country skiers at the 2010 Winter Olympics
Olympic cross-country skiers of Russia
Russian male cross-country skiers
Tour de Ski skiers
Sportspeople from Nizhny Novgorod Oblast